Opogona trichoceros is a moth of the family Tineidae. It is found in New Guinea.

References

Opogona
Moths described in 1930
Moths of New Guinea
Taxa named by Edward Meyrick